Cytidine diphosphate glucose, often abbreviated CDP-glucose, is a nucleotide-linked sugar consisting of cytidine diphospahte and glucose.

Biosynthesis

CDP-glucose is produced from CTP and glucose-1-phosphate by the enzyme glucose-1-phosphate cytidylyltransferase.

References

Biochemistry
Nucleotides